Scotinotylus vernalis is a species of sheet weaver found in Canada and the United States. It was described by Emerton in 1882.

References

Linyphiidae
Fauna of the United States
Spiders of North America
Spiders described in 1882
Fauna without expected TNC conservation status